The APG III system of flowering plant classification is the third version of a modern, mostly molecular-based, system of plant taxonomy being developed by the Angiosperm Phylogeny Group (APG). Published in 2009, it was superseded in 2016 by a further revision, the APG IV system. 

Along with the publication outlining the new system, there were two accompanying publications in the same issue of the Botanical Journal of the Linnean Society:
 The first, by Chase & Reveal, was a formal phylogenetic classification of all land plants (embryophytes), compatible with the APG III classification. As the APG have chosen to eschew ranks above order, this paper was meant to fit the system into the existing Linnaean hierarchy for those that prefer such a classification. The result was that all land plants were placed in the class Equisetopsida, which was then divided into 16 subclasses and a multitude of superorders.
 The second, by Haston et al., was a linear sequence of families following the APG III system (LAPG III). This provided a numbered list to the 413 families of APG III. A linear sequence is of particular use to herbarium curators and those working on floristic works wishing to arrange their taxa according to APG III.

Organization
The APG III system recognized all of the 45 orders of the previous system, as well as 14 new ones. The order Ceratophyllales was erroneously marked as a new order, as it had been recognized in both of the previous APG systems. The newly recognized orders were:
Amborellales, Nymphaeales, Chloranthales, Petrosaviales, Trochodendrales, Buxales, Vitales, Zygophyllales, Picramniales, Huerteales, Berberidopsidales, Escalloniales, Bruniales, and Paracryphiales.

The designation of alternative "bracketed families" was abandoned in APG III, because its inclusion in the previous system had been unpopular. APG III recognized 413 families, 43 fewer than in the previous system. Forty-four of the 55 "bracketed families" were discontinued, and 20 other families were discontinued as well.

The discontinued bracketed families were: 
Illiciaceae, Alliaceae, Agapanthaceae, Agavaceae, Aphyllanthaceae, Hesperocallidaceae, Hyacinthaceae, Laxmanniaceae, Ruscaceae, Themidaceae, Asphodelaceae, Hemerocallidaceae, Kingdoniaceae, Fumariaceae, Pteridophyllaceae, Didymelaceae, Tetracentraceae, Pterostemonaceae, Hypseocharitaceae, Francoaceae, Memecylaceae, Lepuropetalaceae, Rhoipteleaceae, Medusagynaceae, Quiinaceae, Malesherbiaceae, Turneraceae, Bretschneideraceae, Diegodendraceae, Cochlospermaceae, Peganaceae, Tetradiclidaceae, Nyssaceae, Ternstroemiaceae, Pellicieraceae, Aucubaceae, Donatiaceae, Lobeliaceae, Desfontainiaceae, Diervillaceae, Dipsacaceae, Linnaeaceae, Morinaceae, and Valerianaceae.

The other discontinued families were: 
Limnocharitaceae, Luzuriagaceae, Sparganiaceae, Ixerbaceae, Ledocarpaceae, Heteropyxidaceae, Psiloxylaceae, Oliniaceae, Rhynchocalycaceae, Parnassiaceae, Maesaceae, Myrsinaceae, Theophrastaceae, Eremosynaceae, Polyosmaceae, Tribelaceae, Sphenostemonaceae, Aralidiaceae, Mackinlayaceae, and Melanophyllaceae.

21 families were accepted in the APG III system which had not been in the previous system, and a few families were moved to a different position. The newly recognized families are:
Cynomoriaceae, Haptanthaceae, Petermanniaceae, Schoepfiaceae, Limeaceae, Lophiocarpaceae, Montiaceae, Talinaceae, Anacampserotaceae, Centroplacaceae, Calophyllaceae, Guamatelaceae, Gerrardinaceae, Dipentodontaceae, Capparidaceae, Cleomaceae, Cytinaceae, Mitrastemonaceae, Metteniusaceae, Linderniaceae, and Thomandersiaceae.

The number of families not placed in any order was reduced from 39 to 10. Apodanthaceae and Cynomoriaceae were placed among the angiosperms, incertae sedis, that is, not in any group within the angiosperms. Eight other families were placed incertae sedis in various supra-ordinal groups within the angiosperms. The families not placed in any order were: 
Apodanthaceae, Cynomoriaceae, Dasypogonaceae, Sabiaceae, Dilleniaceae, Icacinaceae, Metteniusaceae, Oncothecaceae, Vahliaceae, and Boraginaceae.

The paragraph below shows the number of families in each order and the placement of those families that were not included in any order. These figures were produced by simply counting the families in the text of the paper that established APG III.

ORDERS: Amborellales (1), Nymphaeales (3), Austrobaileyales (3), Chloranthales (1), Canellales (2), Piperales (5), 
Magnoliales (6), Laurales (7), Acorales (1), Alismatales (13), Petrosaviales (1), Dioscoreales (3), Pandanales (5), Liliales (10), Asparagales (14), Arecales (1), Poales (16), Commelinales (5), Zingiberales (8), Ceratophyllales (1), Ranunculales (7), 
Proteales (3), Trochodendrales (1), Buxales (2), Gunnerales (2), Saxifragales (14), Vitales (1), Zygophyllales (2), 
Celastrales (2), Oxalidales (7), Malpighiales (35), Fabales (4), Rosales (9), Fagales (7), Cucurbitales (7), Geraniales (3), Myrtales (9), Crossosomatales (7), Picramniales (1), Sapindales (9), Huerteales (3), Brassicales (17), Malvales (10), Berberidopsidales (2), Santalales (7), Caryophyllales (34), Cornales (6), Ericales (22), Garryales (2), Gentianales (5), 
Solanales (5), Lamiales (23), Aquifoliales (5), Asterales (11), Escalloniales (1), Bruniales (2), Apiales (7), Paracryphiales (1), Dipsacales (2).

SUPRA-ORDINAL GROUPS: commelinids (1), basal eudicots (1), Pentapetalae (1), lamiids incertae sedis (3), core lamiids (2), angiosperms incertae sedis (2).

The circumscription of the family Icacinaceae remains especially doubtful. Apodytes and its close relative, Rhaphiostylis, as well as Emmotum, Cassinopsis, and a few other genera were provisionally retained within it until further studies can determine whether they properly belong there.

Three genera (Gumillea, Nicobariodendron, and Petenaea) were placed within the angiosperms incertae sedis. Gumillea had been unplaced in APG II. Nicobariodendron and Petenaea were newly added to the list. The latter was later placed into its own family Petenaeaceae in the order Huerteales

The classification is shown below in two versions. The short version goes to the level of orders and of families unplaced in an order. The detailed version shows all the families. Orders at the same level in the classification are arranged alphabetically. Note that orders may not contain the same families as in earlier versions of the APG system (APG system, APG II system). Further detail on relationships can be seen in the phylogenetic tree below.

Short version 
 clade angiosperms
 order Amborellales
 order Nymphaeales
 order Austrobaileyales
 order Chloranthales
 clade magnoliids
 order Canellales
 order Laurales
 order Magnoliales
 order Piperales
 clade monocots
 order Acorales
 order Alismatales
 order Asparagales
 order Dioscoreales
 order Liliales
 order Pandanales
 order Petrosaviales
clade commelinids
 family Dasypogonaceae—unplaced in an order
 order Arecales
 order Commelinales
 order Poales
 order Zingiberales
 probable sister of eudicots
 order Ceratophyllales
 clade eudicots
 family Sabiaceae—unplaced in an order
 order Buxales
 order Proteales
 order Ranunculales
 order Trochodendrales
 clade core eudicots
 family Dilleniaceae—unplaced in an order
 order Gunnerales
 order Saxifragales
 clade rosids
 order Vitales
 clade fabids (eurosids I)
 order Celastrales
 order Cucurbitales
 order Fabales
 order Fagales
 order Malpighiales
 order Oxalidales
 order Rosales
 order Zygophyllales
 clade malvids (eurosids II)
 order Brassicales
 order Crossosomatales
 order Geraniales
 order Huerteales
 order Malvales
 order Myrtales
 order Picramniales
 order Sapindales
 (back to core eudicots)
 order Berberidopsidales
 order Caryophyllales
 order Santalales
 clade asterids
 order Cornales
 order Ericales
 clade lamiids (euasterids I)
 family Boraginaceae—unplaced in an order
 family Vahliaceae—unplaced in an order
 family Icacinaceae—unplaced in an order
 family Metteniusaceae—unplaced in an order
 family Oncothecaceae—unplaced in an order
 order Garryales
 order Gentianales
 order Lamiales
 order Solanales
 clade campanulids (euasterids II)
 order Apiales
 order Aquifoliales
 order Asterales
 order Bruniales
 order Dipsacales
 order Escalloniales
 order Paracryphiales

Detailed version 
Legend:

* = new family placement;
† = newly recognized order for the APG system;
§ = new family circumscription described in the text;
$ = families that represent the broader circumscription of options available in APG II and favoured here;
$$ = families that were in square brackets in APG II, the narrower circumscriptions favoured here.

Angiosperms 
 †Amborellales Melikyan, A.V.Bobrov & Zaytzeva
 Amborellaceae Pichon
 †Nymphaeales Salisb. ex Bercht. & J.Presl
 $$Cabombaceae Rich. ex A.Rich.
 *Hydatellaceae U.Hamann
 $$Nymphaeaceae Salisb.
 Austrobaileyales Takht. ex Reveal
 Austrobaileyaceae Croizat
 $Schisandraceae Blume (including Illiciaceae A.C.Sm.)
 Trimeniaceae L.S.Gibbs
 †Chloranthales R.Br.
 Chloranthaceae R.Br. ex Sims

Magnoliids 
 Canellales Cronquist
 Canellaceae Mart.
 Winteraceae R.Br. ex Lindl.
 Piperales Bercht. & J.Presl
 Aristolochiaceae Juss.
 Hydnoraceae C.Agardh
 Lactoridaceae Engl.
 Piperaceae Giseke
 Saururaceae F.Voigt
 Laurales Juss. ex Bercht. & J.Presl
 Atherospermataceae R.Br.
 Calycanthaceae Lindl.
 Gomortegaceae Reiche
 Hernandiaceae Blume
 Lauraceae Juss.
 Monimiaceae Juss.
 Siparunaceae Schodde
 Magnoliales Juss. ex Bercht. & J.Presl
 Annonaceae Juss.
 Degeneriaceae I.W.Bailey & A.C.Sm.
 Eupomatiaceae Orb.
 Himantandraceae Diels
 Magnoliaceae Juss.
 Myristicaceae R.Br.

Monocots 
 Acorales Link
 Acoraceae Martinov
 Alismatales R.Br. ex Bercht. & J.Presl
 §Alismataceae Vent. (including Limnocharitaceae Takht. ex Cronquist)
 Aponogetonaceae Planch.
 Araceae Juss.
 Butomaceae Mirb.
 Cymodoceaceae Vines
 Hydrocharitaceae Juss.
 Juncaginaceae Rich.
 Posidoniaceae Vines
 Potamogetonaceae Bercht. & J.Presl
 Ruppiaceae Horan.
 Scheuchzeriaceae F.Rudolphi
 Tofieldiaceae Takht.
 Zosteraceae Dumort.
 †Petrosaviales Takht.
 Petrosaviaceae Hutch.
 Dioscoreales R.Br.
 Burmanniaceae Blume
 Dioscoreaceae R.Br.
 Nartheciaceae Fr. ex Bjurzon
 Pandanales R.Br. ex Bercht. & J.Presl
 Cyclanthaceae Poit. ex A.Rich.
 Pandanaceae R.Br.
 Stemonaceae Caruel
 Triuridaceae Gardner
 Velloziaceae J.Agardh
 Liliales Perleb
 §Alstroemeriaceae Dumort. (including Luzuriagaceae Lotsy)
 Campynemataceae Dumort.
 Colchicaceae DC.
 Corsiaceae Becc.
 Liliaceae Juss.
 Melanthiaceae Batsch ex Borkh.
 *Petermanniaceae Hutch.
 Philesiaceae Dumort.
 Ripogonaceae Conran & Clifford
 Smilacaceae Vent.
 Asparagales Link
 $Amaryllidaceae J.St.-Hil. (including Agapanthaceae F.Voigt, Alliaceae Borkh.)
 $Asparagaceae Juss. (including Agavaceae Dumort., Aphyllanthaceae Burnett, Hesperocallidaceae Traub, Hyacinthaceae Batsch ex Borkh., Laxmanniaceae Bubani, Ruscaceae M.Roem., Themidaceae Salisb.)
 Asteliaceae Dumort.
 Blandfordiaceae R.Dahlgren & Clifford
 Boryaceae M.W.Chase, Rudall & Conran
 Doryanthaceae R.Dahlgren & Clifford
 Hypoxidaceae R.Br.
 Iridaceae Juss.
 Ixioliriaceae Nakai
 Lanariaceae R.Dahlgren & A.E.van Wyk
 Orchidaceae Juss.
 Tecophilaeaceae Leyb.
 $Xanthorrhoeaceae Dumort. (including Asphodelaceae Juss. and Hemerocallidaceae R.Br.)
 Xeronemataceae M.W.Chase, Rudall & M.F.Fay

Commelinids 
 Dasypogonaceae Dumort.
 Arecales Bromhead
 Arecaceae Bercht. & J.Presl
 Commelinales Mirb. ex Bercht. & J.Presl
 Commelinaceae Mirb.
 Haemodoraceae R.Br.
 Hanguanaceae Airy Shaw
 Philydraceae Link
 Pontederiaceae Kunth
 Poales Small
 Anarthriaceae D.F.Cutler & Airy Shaw
 Bromeliaceae Juss.
 Centrolepidaceae Endl.
 Cyperaceae Juss.
 Ecdeiocoleaceae D.F.Cutler & Airy Shaw
 Eriocaulaceae Martinov
 Flagellariaceae Dumort.
 Joinvilleaceae Toml. & A.C.Sm.
 Juncaceae Juss.
 Mayacaceae Kunth
 Poaceae Barnhart
 Rapateaceae Dumort.
 Restionaceae R.Br.
 Thurniaceae Engl.
 §Typhaceae Juss. (including Sparganiaceae Hanin)
 Xyridaceae C.Agardh
 Zingiberales Griseb.
 Cannaceae Juss.
 Costaceae Nakai
 Heliconiaceae Vines
 Lowiaceae Ridl.
 Marantaceae R.Br.
 Musaceae Juss.
 Strelitziaceae Hutch.
 Zingiberaceae Martinov

Probable sister of eudicots 
 Ceratophyllales Link
 Ceratophyllaceae Gray

Eudicots 
 Ranunculales Juss. ex Bercht. & J.Presl
 Berberidaceae Juss.
 $Circaeasteraceae Hutch. (including Kingdoniaceae Airy Shaw)
 Eupteleaceae K.Wilh.
 Lardizabalaceae R.Br.
 Menispermaceae Juss.
 $Papaveraceae Juss. (including Fumariaceae Marquis, Pteridophyllaceae Nakai ex Reveal & Hoogland)
 Ranunculaceae Juss.
 Sabiaceae Blume
 Proteales Juss. ex Bercht. & J.Presl
 Nelumbonaceae A.Rich.
 $$Platanaceae T.Lestib.
 $$Proteaceae Juss.
 †Trochodendrales Takht. ex Cronquist
 $Trochodendraceae Eichler (including Tetracentraceae A.C.Sm.)
 †Buxales Takht. ex Reveal
 $Buxaceae Dumort. (including Didymelaceae Leandri)
 *Haptanthaceae C.Nelson

Core eudicots 
 Gunnerales Takht. ex Reveal
 $$Gunneraceae Meisn.
 $$Myrothamnaceae Nied.
 Dilleniaceae Salisb.
 Saxifragales Bercht. & J.Presl
 Altingiaceae Horan.
 Aphanopetalaceae Doweld
 Cercidiphyllaceae Engl.
 Crassulaceae J.St.-Hil.
 Daphniphyllaceae Müll.-Arg.
 Grossulariaceae DC.
 $$Haloragaceae R.Br.
 Hamamelidaceae R.Br.
 $Iteaceae J.Agardh (including Pterostemonaceae Small)
 Paeoniaceae Raf.
 $$Penthoraceae Rydb. ex Britt.
 *§Peridiscaceae Kuhlm. (including Medusandraceae Brenan, Soyauxia Oliver)
 Saxifragaceae Juss.
 $$Tetracarpaeaceae Nakai
 †Berberidopsidales Doweld
 Aextoxicaceae Engl. & Gilg
 Berberidopsidaceae Takht.
 Santalales R.Br. ex Bercht. & J.Presl
 *Balanophoraceae Rich.
 Loranthaceae Juss.
 Misodendraceae J.Agardh
 Santalaceae R.Br.
 Olacaceae R.Br.
 Opiliaceae Valeton
 *Schoepfiaceae Blume
 Caryophyllales Juss. ex Bercht. & J.Presl
 Achatocarpaceae Heimerl
 Aizoaceae Martinov
 Amaranthaceae Juss.
 *Anacampserotaceae Eggli & Nyffeler
 Ancistrocladaceae Planch. ex Walp.
 Asteropeiaceae Takht. ex Reveal & Hoogland
 Barbeuiaceae Nakai
 Basellaceae Raf.
 Cactaceae Juss.
 Caryophyllaceae Juss.
 §Didiereaceae Radlk.
 Dioncophyllaceae Airy Shaw
 Droseraceae Salisb.
 Drosophyllaceae Chrtek, Slavíková & Studnicka
 Frankeniaceae Desv.
 Gisekiaceae Nakai
 Halophytaceae A.Soriano
 *Limeaceae Shipunov ex Reveal
 *Lophiocarpaceae Doweld & Reveal
 §Molluginaceae Bartl.
 *Montiaceae Raf.
 Nepenthaceae Dumort.
 Nyctaginaceae Juss.
 Physenaceae Takht.
 Phytolaccaceae R.Br.
 Plumbaginaceae Juss.
 Polygonaceae Juss.
 §Portulacaceae Juss.
 Rhabdodendraceae Prance
 Sarcobataceae Behnke
 Simmondsiaceae Tiegh.
 Stegnospermataceae Nakai
 *Talinaceae Doweld
 Tamaricaceae Link

Rosids 
 †Vitales Juss. ex Bercht. & J.Presl
 Vitaceae Juss.

Fabids (eurosids I) 
 †Zygophyllales Link
 $$Krameriaceae Dumort.
 $$Zygophyllaceae R.Br.
 Celastrales Link
 $Celastraceae R.Br. (including Lepuropetalaceae Nakai, Parnassiaceae Martinov, Pottingeriaceae Takht.)
 Lepidobotryaceae J.Léonard
 Oxalidales Bercht. & J.Presl
 Brunelliaceae Engl.
 Cephalotaceae Dumort.
 Connaraceae R.Br.
 Cunoniaceae R.Br.
 Elaeocarpaceae Juss. ex DC.
 *Huaceae A.Chev.
 Oxalidaceae R.Br.
 Malpighiales Juss. ex Bercht. & J.Presl
 Achariaceae Harms
 Balanopaceae Benth. & Hook.f.
 Bonnetiaceae L.Beauvis. ex Nakai
 *Calophyllaceae J.Agardh
 Caryocaraceae Voigt
 *Centroplacaceae Doweld & Reveal
 $$Chrysobalanaceae R.Br.
 §Clusiaceae Lindl.
 Ctenolophonaceae Exell & Mendonça
 $$Dichapetalaceae Baill.
 Elatinaceae Dumort.
 $$§Erythroxylaceae Kunth (including Aneulophus Benth.)
 Euphorbiaceae Juss.
 $$Euphroniaceae Marc.-Berti
 Goupiaceae Miers
 Humiriaceae A.Juss.
 Hypericaceae Juss.
 Irvingiaceae Exell & Mendonça
 Ixonanthaceae Planch. ex Miq.
 Lacistemataceae Mart.
 Linaceae DC. ex Perleb
 Lophopyxidaceae H.Pfeiff.
 Malpighiaceae Juss.
 $Ochnaceae DC. (including Medusagynaceae Engl. & Gilg, Quiinaceae Choisy)
 Pandaceae Engl. & Gilg
 $Passifloraceae Juss. ex Roussel (including Malesherbiaceae D.Don, Turneraceae Kunth ex DC.)
 Phyllanthaceae Martinov
 Picrodendraceae Small
 Podostemaceae Rich. ex Kunth
 Putranjivaceae Meisn.
 *Rafflesiaceae Dumort.
 $$Rhizophoraceae Pers.
 Salicaceae Mirb.
 $$Trigoniaceae A.Juss.
 Violaceae Batsch
 Cucurbitales Juss. ex Bercht. & J.Presl
 Anisophylleaceae Ridl.
 Begoniaceae C.Agardh
 Coriariaceae DC.
 Corynocarpaceae Engl.
 Cucurbitaceae Juss.
 Datiscaceae Dumort.
 Tetramelaceae Airy Shaw
 Fabales Bromhead
 Fabaceae Lindl.
 Polygalaceae Hoffmanns. & Link
 Quillajaceae D.Don
 Surianaceae Arn.
 Fagales Engl.
 Betulaceae Gray
 Casuarinaceae R.Br.
 Fagaceae Dumort.
 §Juglandaceae DC. ex Perleb (including Rhoipteleaceae Hand.-Mazz.)
 Myricaceae A.Rich. ex Kunth
 Nothofagaceae Kuprian
 Ticodendraceae Gómez-Laur. & L.D.Gómez
 Rosales Bercht. & J.Presl
 Barbeyaceae Rendle
 Cannabaceae Martinov
 Dirachmaceae Hutch.
 Elaeagnaceae Juss.
 Moraceae Gaudich.
 Rhamnaceae Juss.
 Rosaceae Juss.
 Ulmaceae Mirb.
 Urticaceae Juss.

malvids (eurosids II) 
 Geraniales Juss. ex Bercht. & J.Presl
 $Geraniaceae Juss. (including Hypseocharitaceae Wedd.)
 $Melianthaceae Horan. (including Francoaceae A.Juss.)
 §Vivianiaceae Klotzsch (including Ledocarpaceae Meyen)
 Myrtales Juss. ex Bercht. & J.Presl
 Alzateaceae S.A.Graham
 Combretaceae R.Br.
 Crypteroniaceae A.DC.
 Lythraceae J.St.-Hil.
 $Melastomataceae Juss. (including Memecylaceae DC.)
 §Myrtaceae Juss. (including Heteropyxidaceae Engl. & Gilg, Psiloxylaceae Croizat)
 Onagraceae Juss.
 §Penaeaceae Sweet ex Guill. (including Oliniaceae Arn., Rhynchocalycaceae L.A.S.Johnson & B.G.Briggs)
 Vochysiaceae A.St.-Hil.
 Crossosomatales Takht. ex Reveal
 *Aphloiaceae Takht.
 Crossosomataceae Engl.
 *Geissolomataceae A.DC.
 *Guamatelaceae S.Oh & D.Potter
 Stachyuraceae J.Agardh
 Staphyleaceae Martinov
 *§Strasburgeriaceae Soler. (including Ixerbaceae Griseb. ex Doweld & Reveal)
 †Picramniales Doweld
 *Picramniaceae Fernando & Quinn
 †Huerteales Doweld
 *Dipentodontaceae Merr.
 *Gerrardinaceae Alford
 Tapisciaceae Takht.
 Brassicales Bromhead
 $Akaniaceae Stapf (including Bretschneideraceae Engl. & Gilg)
 Bataceae Mart. ex Perleb
 §Brassicaceae Burnett
 *Capparaceae Juss.
 Caricaceae Dumort.
 *Cleomaceae Bercht. & J.Presl
 Emblingiaceae J.Agardh
 Gyrostemonaceae A.Juss.
 Koeberliniaceae Engl.
 Limnanthaceae R.Br.
 Moringaceae Martinov
 Pentadiplandraceae Hutch. & Dalziel
 Resedaceae Martinov
 Salvadoraceae Lindl.
 Setchellanthaceae Iltis
 Tovariaceae Pax
 Tropaeolaceae Juss. ex DC.
 Malvales Juss. ex Bercht. & J.Presl
 $Bixaceae Kunth (including Cochlospermaceae Planch., Diegodendraceae Capuron)
 Cistaceae Juss.
 *Cytinaceae A.Rich.
 Dipterocarpaceae Blume
 Malvaceae Juss.
 Muntingiaceae C.Bayer, M.W.Chase & M.F.Fay
 Neuradaceae Kostel.
 Sarcolaenaceae Caruel
 Sphaerosepalaceae Tiegh. ex Bullock
 Thymelaeaceae Juss.
 Sapindales Juss. ex Bercht. & J.Presl
 Anacardiaceae R.Br.
 Biebersteiniaceae Schnizl.
 Burseraceae Kunth
 Kirkiaceae Takht.
 Meliaceae Juss.
 $Nitrariaceae Lindl. (including Peganaceae Tiegh. ex Takht., Tetradiclidaceae Takht.)
 Rutaceae Juss.
 Sapindaceae Juss.
 Simaroubaceae DC.

Asterids 
 Cornales Link.
 Cornaceae Bercht. & J.Presl (including Nyssaceae Juss. ex Dumort.)
 Curtisiaceae Takht.
 Grubbiaceae Endl. ex Meisn.
 Hydrangeaceae Dumort.
 Hydrostachyaceae Engl.
 Loasaceae Juss.
 Ericales Bercht. & J.Presl
 Actinidiaceae Engl. & Gilg.
 Balsaminaceae A.Rich.
 Clethraceae Klotzsch
 Cyrillaceae Lindl.
 Diapensiaceae Lindl.
 Ebenaceae Gürke
 Ericaceae Juss.
 Fouquieriaceae DC.
 Lecythidaceae A.Rich.
 Marcgraviaceae Bercht. & J.Presl
 *Mitrastemonaceae Makino
 $Pentaphylacaceae Engl. (including Ternstroemiaceae Mirb. ex DC.)
 Polemoniaceae Juss.
 §Primulaceae Batsch ex Borkh. (including Maesaceae Anderb., B.Ståhl & Källersjö, Myrsinaceae R.Br., Theophrastaceae G.Don)
 Roridulaceae Martinov
 Sapotaceae Juss.
 Sarraceniaceae Dumort.
 $$Sladeniaceae Airy Shaw
 Styracaceae DC. & Spreng.
 Symplocaceae Desf.
 $Tetrameristaceae Hutch. (including Pellicieraceae L.Beauvis.)
 Theaceae Mirb. ex Ker Gawl.

lamiids (euasterids I) 
 §*Boraginaceae Juss. (including Hoplestigmataceae Gilg)
 Vahliaceae Dandy
 Icacinaceae Miers
 Metteniusaceae H.Karst. ex Schnizl.
 Oncothecaceae Kobuski ex Airy Shaw
 Garryales Lindl.
 Eucommiaceae Engl.
 $Garryaceae Lindl. (including Aucubaceae Bercht. & J.Presl)
 Gentianales Juss. ex Bercht. & J.Presl
 Apocynaceae Juss.
 Gelsemiaceae Struwe & V.A.Albert
 Gentianaceae Juss.
 Loganiaceae R.Br. ex Mart.
 Rubiaceae Juss.
 Lamiales Bromhead
 §Acanthaceae Juss.
 Bignoniaceae Juss.
 Byblidaceae Domin
 Calceolariaceae Olmstead
 Carlemanniaceae Airy Shaw
 Gesneriaceae Rich. & Juss.
 Lamiaceae Martinov
 *Linderniaceae Borsch, K.Müll., & Eb.Fisch.
 Lentibulariaceae Rich.
 Martyniaceae Horan.
 Oleaceae Hoffmanns. & Link
 Orobanchaceae Vent.
 Paulowniaceae Nakai
 Pedaliaceae R.Br.
 Phrymaceae Schauer
 §Plantaginaceae Juss.
 Plocospermataceae Hutch.
 Schlegeliaceae Reveal
 Scrophulariaceae Juss.
 Stilbaceae Kunth
 Tetrachondraceae Wettst.
 *Thomandersiaceae Sreem.
 Verbenaceae J.St.-Hil.
 Solanales Juss. ex Bercht. & J.Presl
 Convolvulaceae Juss.
 Hydroleaceae R.Br. ex Edwards
 Montiniaceae Nakai
 Solanaceae Juss.
 Sphenocleaceae T.Baskerv.

campanulids (euasterids II) 
 Aquifoliales Senft
 Aquifoliaceae Bercht. & J.Presl
 §Cardiopteridaceae Blume (including Leptaulaceae Tiegh.)
 Helwingiaceae Decne.
 Phyllonomaceae Small
 Stemonuraceae Kårehed
 Asterales Link
 Alseuosmiaceae Airy Shaw
 Argophyllaceae Takht.
 Asteraceae Bercht. & J.Presl
 Calyceraceae R.Br. ex Rich.
 $Campanulaceae Juss. (including Lobeliaceae Juss.)
 Goodeniaceae R.Br.
 Menyanthaceae Dumort.
 Pentaphragmataceae J.Agardh
 Phellinaceae Takht.
 Rousseaceae DC.
 $Stylidiaceae R.Br. (including Donatiaceae B.Chandler)
 †Escalloniales R.Br.
 §Escalloniaceae R.Br. ex Dumort. (including Eremosynaceae Dandy, Polyosmaceae Blume, Tribelaceae Airy Shaw)
 †Bruniales Dumort.
 Bruniaceae R.Br. ex DC.
 §Columelliaceae D.Don (including Desfontainiaceae Endl.)
 †Paracryphiales Takht. ex Reveal
 §Paracryphiaceae Airy Shaw (including *Quintiniaceae Doweld, Sphenostemonaceae P.Royen & Airy Shaw)
 Dipsacales Juss. ex Bercht. & J.Presl
 Adoxaceae E.Mey.
 §Caprifoliaceae Juss. (including Diervillaceae Pyck, Dipsacaceae Juss., Linnaeaceae Backlund, Morinaceae Raf., Valerianaceae Batsch)
 Apiales Nakai
 Apiaceae Lindl. (including Mackinlayaceae)
 Araliaceae Juss.
 Griseliniaceae J.R.Forst. & G.Forst. ex A.Cunn.
 Myodocarpaceae Doweld
 Pennantiaceae J.Agardh
 Pittosporaceae R.Br.
 §Torricelliaceae Hu (including Aralidiaceae Philipson & B.C.Stone, Melanophyllaceae Takht. ex Airy Shaw)

Taxa of uncertain position 
 Apodanthaceae Takht. (three genera, now in Cucurbitales)
 Cynomoriaceae Endl. ex Lindl.
 Gumillea Ruiz & Pav.
 Petenaea Lundell (now in Huerteales)
 Nicobariodendron (see Simmons, 2004; probably in Celastraceae).

Phylogeny 
The APG III system was based on a phylogenetic tree for the angiosperms which included all of the 59 orders and 4 of the unplaced families. The systematic positions of the other 6 unplaced families was so uncertain that they could not be placed in any of the polytomies in the tree. They are shown in the classification table entitled "Detailed version" above, 4 in Euasterids I and 2 in Taxa of uncertain position.

The phylogenetic tree shown below was published with the APG III system, but without some of the labels that are added here.

Subfamilies replacing discontinued families
A number of subfamilies have been proposed to replace some of the families which were optional (i.e. bracketed) in APG II, but have been discontinued in APG III. These are shown in the table below.

References

External links
 The APG III paper: An update of the Angiosperm Phylogeny Group classification for the orders and families of flowering plants: APG III
 The LAPG III paper: The Linear Angiosperm Phylogeny Group (LAPG) III: a linear sequence of the families in APG III
 The phylogenetic classification of land plants paper: A phylogenetic classification of the land plants to accompany APG III
 Angiosperm Phylogeny Website at the Missouri Botanical Garden website

APG 03
2009 in science
2009 introductions
Angiosperm Phylogeny Group